Francisco Guerra (1587 – 3 December 1657) was a Roman Catholic prelate who served as Bishop of Plasencia (1655–1656) and Bishop of Cádiz (1642–1655).

Biography
Francisco Guerra was born in Villagarcía de Campos, Spain in 1587 and appointed a priest in the Order of Friars Minor. On 17 February 1642, he was selected by the King of Spain and confirmed by Pope Urban VIII as Bishop of Cádiz. On 26 May 1655, he was selected by the King of Spain and confirmed by Pope Alexander VII as Bishop of Plasencia. He served as Bishop of Plasencia until his death on 3 December 1657.

References

External links and additional sources
 (for Chronology of Bishops)  
 (for Chronology of Bishops) 
 (for Chronology of Bishops)  
 (for Chronology of Bishops) 

17th-century Roman Catholic bishops in Spain
Bishops appointed by Pope Urban VIII
Bishops appointed by Pope Alexander VII
1587 births
1656 deaths
People from the Province of Valladolid
Franciscan bishops